Milk Lines was a Toronto, Ontario band co-led by Emily Bitze and Jeff Clarke.

Membership and history 
Band members included co-leaders Emily Bitze and Jeff Clarke, who both did guitar and vocals, Kyle Connolly was the instrumentalist and Omri Gondor was the drummer.

In 2014, Milk Lines performed at the JAMJAM A Music + Art + Food Festival in a Forest.

Critical reception 
Exclaim! compared the band's sound to The Sadies, which they also described as "jangly psych-rock and smoky western". BlogTO described the band's sound as psychedelic.

References

External links 

 Milk Lines, In The Red Records 

Musical groups from Toronto
Canadian psychedelic rock music groups